Appolonius crassus is a species of dirt-colored seed bug in the family Rhyparochromidae, found in southern and eastern Asia.

References

External links

 

Rhyparochromidae
Insects described in 1906